Sphaeropteris ledermannii is a species of fern in the family Cyatheaceae, native to New Guinea. It was first described by Guido Brause in 1920 as Hemitelia ledermannii, and transferred to Sphaeropteris by Rolla Tryon in 1970.

References

ledermannii
Flora of New Guinea
Plants described in 1920